The Bundesstraße 7 (abbr. B7) is a German federal highway (Bundesstraße) that stretches from the Dutch border at Venlo in the West to Rochlitz near Chemnitz in the East. Because of its western origin some stretches of the B 7 are designated as "Holländische Straße" (Dutch Road), e.g., in Kassel and Calden.

History
The former Reichsstraße 7 extended from Schmölln over Meerane, Glauchau, Chemnitz and Freiberg to Dresden, where it linked with the Reichsstraße 6. The former portion between Chemnitz and Dresden is now called the Bundesstraße 173.

Between Eisenach and Erfurt the B 7 follows the path of the former Via Regia. The original plan marked Dresden as he eastern terminus, however this portion was completed during the Third Reich and called the Bundesstraße 173.

New Developments
In some areas the Bundesstraße 7 is replaced by Autobahns. For example, between Hagen-Hohenlimburg and the former autobahn terminus in the eastern city of Iserlohn the B 7 becomes the Bundesautobahn 46. Also, between Kassel and Eisenach the B 7 is slated to be replaced by the new Bundesautobahn 44, the first piece of which was opened at Hessisch Lichtenau was in October 2005. Environmental concerns have been raised about the project, as the autobahn is proposed to run through the national park Meißner-Kaufunger Wald.

Since August 2005 heavy transport vehicles have been banned from a  stretch of the B 7. The ban applies for a year and is enforced between Kassel at the A 7 junction and Wehretal. Vehicles originating or ending in the Kassel area are exempt from the ban.

Route / Junctions

See also
List of federal highways in Germany

External links
http://www.strassenimpressionen.com - photographs of the Bundesstraße 7

Roads in North Rhine-Westphalia
Roads in Hesse
Roads in Saxony
007